Camelliibacillus  is a Gram-positive, non-endospore-forming, anaerobic, rod-shaped, and non-motile genus of bacteria from the family of Bacillaceae with one known species (Camelliibacillus cellulosilyticus). Camelliibacillus cellulosilyticus has been isolated from green tea.

References

Bacillaceae
Bacteria genera
Monotypic bacteria genera